The 1957 La Flèche Wallonne was the 21st edition of La Flèche Wallonne cycle race and was held on 4 May 1957. The race started in Charleroi and finished in Liège. The race was won by Raymond Impanis.

General classification

References

1957 in road cycling
1957
1957 in Belgian sport
1957 Challenge Desgrange-Colombo